Oxalicibacterium is a genus of bacteria in the Oxalobacteraceae family.

External links
NCBI taxonomy browser

Burkholderiales
Bacteria genera